was a pioneering Japanese film director and writer. So far, only two of his works have been released on DVD: Orochi (The Serpent, 1925) and the short film Backward Flow (Gyakuryū, 1924). As a writer, he used another name: Otsuma Shinozuka.

Life 
Futagawa was born Kichinosuke Takizawa on 18 June 1899, in Misaki, Shiba, Tokyo (present-day Mita, Minato, Tokyo), to a family of tea merchants. His younger brother by three years was film director Eisuke Takizawa.

He studied business at Chuo University, but dropped out to join Taishō Katsuei in Yokohama in April 1921.

In the silent era, Futagawa worked with actor Tsumasaburō Bandō.

References

External links 

 
 
 

Japanese film directors
Samurai film directors
1899 births
1966 deaths
People from Tokyo
Place of birth missing
Place of death missing